In computability theory, the T predicate, first studied by mathematician Stephen Cole Kleene, is a particular set of triples of natural numbers that is used to represent computable functions within formal theories of arithmetic. Informally, the T predicate tells whether a particular computer program will halt when run with a particular input, and the corresponding U function is used to obtain the results of the computation if the program does halt. As with the smn theorem, the original notation used by Kleene has become standard terminology for the concept.

Definition 

The definition depends on a suitable Gödel numbering that assigns natural numbers to computable functions (given as Turing machines). This numbering must be sufficiently effective that, given an index of a computable function and an input to the function, it is possible to effectively simulate the computation of the function on that input.  The  predicate is obtained by formalizing this simulation.

The ternary relation  takes three natural numbers as arguments.  is true if  encodes a computation history of the computable function with index  when run with input , and the program halts as the last step of this computation history. That is, 
  first asks whether  is the Gödel number of a finite sequence  of complete configurations of the Turing machine with index , running a computation on input .  
 If so,  then asks if this sequence begins with the starting state of the computation and each successive element of the sequence corresponds to a single step of the Turing machine. 
 If it does,  finally asks whether the sequence  ends with the machine in a halting state. 
If all three of these questions have a positive answer, then  is true, otherwise, it is false.

The  predicate is primitive recursive in the sense that there is a primitive recursive function that, given inputs for the predicate, correctly determines the truth value of the predicate on those inputs. 

There is a corresponding primitive recursive function  such that if  is true then  returns the output of the function with index  on input .

Because Kleene's formalism attaches a number of inputs to each function, the predicate  can only be used for functions that take one input. There are additional predicates for functions with multiple inputs; the relation

is true if  encodes a halting computation of the function with index  on the inputs .

Like , all functions  are primitive recursive.
Examples of such arithmetical theories include Robinson arithmetic and stronger theories such as Peano arithmetic.

Normal form theorem 

The  predicates can be used to obtain Kleene's normal form theorem for computable functions (Soare 1987, p. 15; Kleene 1943, p. 52—53). This states there exists a fixed primitive recursive function  such that a function  is computable if and only if there is a number  such that for all  one has
,
By the theorem, the definition of every general recursive function f can be rewritten into a normal form such that the μ operator is used only once, viz. immediately below the topmost , which is independent of the computable function .

Arithmetical hierarchy 

In addition to encoding computability, the T predicate can be used to generate complete sets in the arithmetical hierarchy. In particular, the set 

which is of the same Turing degree as the halting problem, is a  complete unary relation (Soare 1987, pp. 28, 41). More generally, the set
 
is a -complete (n+1)-ary predicate. Thus, once a representation of the Tn predicate is obtained in a theory of arithmetic, a representation of a -complete predicate can be obtained from it.

This construction can be extended higher in the arithmetical hierarchy, as in Post's theorem (compare Hinman 2005, p. 397). For example, if a set  is  complete then the set

is  complete.

Notes

References 
 Peter Hinman, 2005, Fundamentals of Mathematical Logic, A K Peters.  
  Reprinted in The Undecidable, Martin Davis, ed., 1965, pp. 255–287.
 —, 1952, Introduction to Metamathematics, North-Holland. Reprinted by Ishi press, 2009, .
 —, 1967. Mathematical Logic, John Wiley. Reprinted by Dover, 2001, .
 Robert I. Soare, 1987, Recursively enumerable sets and degrees, Perspectives in Mathematical Logic, Springer. 

Computability theory